The following is a list of ambassadors of France to Algeria since Algerian independence in 1962. All these diplomats technically have the title of Ambassadeur, Haut Représentant (Ambassador, High Representative).

See also
 Algeria–France relations
 Embassy of France, Algiers
 Villa des Oliviers

References

 
France
Algeria